McGee House may refer to:

United States
(by state, then city/town)

James and Mary McGee House, Florence, Arizona, listed on the NRHP in Pinal County, Arizona
John McGee House, Cornishville, Kentucky, listed on the NRHP in Mercer County, Kentucky
McGee House (Harrodsburg, Kentucky), listed on the National Register of Historic Places (NRHP) in Mercer County, Kentucky
McNeill-McGee House, Lake Bounds, Mississippi, listed on the NRHP in Clarke County, Mississippi
McGee House (Kalispell, Montana), listed on the NRHP in Flathead County, Montana
McGee House (Aztec, New Mexico), listed on the NRHP in San Juan County, New Mexico
Wallace-McGee House, Columbia, South Carolina, NRHP-listed
Turner-White-McGee House, Roganville, Texas, listed on the NRHP in Jasper County, Texas

See also
McGhee House (disambiguation)
McGehee House (disambiguation)